The 2021 U.S. International Figure Skating Classic was held on September 14–17, 2021 in Norwood, Massachusetts. Medals were awarded in the disciplines of men's singles, women's singles, and ice dance. This was the first time since 2013 that the competition was not included as part of the ISU Challenger Series, as well as the first time that pair skating was not included as a discipline.

Entries 
U.S. Figure Skating posted the preliminary entries on August 26, 2021.

Changes to preliminary entries

Results

Men

Women

Ice dance

References 

U.S. International Figure Skating Classic
U.S. International Figure Skating Classic
Sports in Norfolk County, Massachusetts